The Chandrapur City Municipal Corporation is the governing body of the city of Chandrapur in the Indian state of Maharashtra. The municipal corporation consists of democratically elected members, is headed by a mayor and administers the city's infrastructure, public services. Members from the state's leading political parties hold elected offices in the corporation. 
Recently the Municipal Corporation has created three nos of Zone offices. Municipal Corporation mechanism in India was introduced during British Rule with formation of municipal corporation in Madras (Chennai) in 1688, later followed by municipal corporations in Bombay (Mumbai) and Calcutta (Kolkata) by 1762. Chandrapur Municipal Corporation has been formed with functions to improve the infrastructure of town.

Revenue sources 

The following are the Income sources for the corporation from the Central and State Government.

Revenue from taxes 
Following is the Tax related revenue for the corporation.

 Property tax.
 Profession tax.
 Entertainment tax.
 Grants from Central and State Government like Goods and Services Tax.
 Advertisement tax.

Revenue from non-tax sources 

Following is the Non Tax related revenue for the corporation.

 Water usage charges.
 Fees from Documentation services.
 Rent received from municipal property.
 Funds from municipal bonds.

List of Mayor 

List of mayor's of Chandrapur Municipal Corporation (CMC).

List of Deputy Mayor

List of Chairman, Standing Committee

Election results

2017 results 
The Municipal corporation elections were held on 19 April 2017 and the result was declared on 21 April 2017.
The results of Election 2017 are as follows.

2012 results 
The results of Election 2012 are as follows.

Administration 
Commissioner - Sanjay Kakade

Additional Commissioner - Bhalchandra Behere

Deputy Commissioner 1 - Gajanan Bokade (In-charge)

Deputy Commissioner 2- Manoj Goswami (In-charge)

City Engineer - Mahesh Barai

References 

Chandrapur
Municipal corporations in Maharashtra
Year of establishment missing